Allophyes is a genus of moths of the family Noctuidae. The genus was described by Tams in 1942.

Species
 Allophyes albithorax (Draudt, 1950)
 Allophyes alfaroi Agenjo, 1951
 Allophyes asiatica (Staudinger, 1892)
 Allophyes benedictina (Staudinger, 1892)
 Allophyes corsica (Spuler, 1905)
 Allophyes cretica Pinker & Reisser, 1978
 Allophyes heliocausta Boursin, 1957
 Allophyes metaxys Boursin, 1953
 Allophyes miaoli Hreblay & Kobayashi, 1997
 Allophyes oxyacanthae (Linnaeus, 1758) – green-brindled crescent
 Allophyes powelli Rungs, 1952
 Allophyes renalis (Wiltshire, 1941)
 Allophyes sericina Ronkay, Varga & Hreblay, 1998
 Allophyes yuennana Hreblay & Ronkay, 1997

References

Cuculliinae
Noctuoidea genera